The 2006 IPC Cycling World Championships were the 2nd World Championships for track and road cycling for athletes with a physical disability. The Championships took place in Aigle, Switzerland from 11–18 September 2006, with track events on the first three days of competition, time trials on days 4 and 5, and road races on days 6 and 7.

Organised by the International Paralympic Committee, the event was the forerunner of the UCI organized Para-cycling Track and Road Championships, and the last to be organized by IPC Cycling; UCI took over the running of the event in 2007.

24 events were held on the track, while 34 events were held on the road.

Medal table

Track events

Road events

References

UCI World Championships
UCI Para-cycling Road World Championships
UCI Para-cycling Track World Championships
2006 in sports
Aigle
2006 in cycle racing
Sport in the canton of Vaud